Charles Holland Mason (August 9, 1822 – June 11, 1894) was a 19th-century American politician and lawyer. Mason served as United States Commissioner for the Indian Territory (now Oklahoma) from 1890 until his death.

Early life and marriage
Mason was born in Walpole, New Hampshire to Joseph and Harriet (Ormsby) Mason. Mason received a thorough classical education to fit him for practicing law. Mason attended the Hancock Literary and Scientific Institute. At age twenty-one, he emigrated West, locating first at Louisville, Kentucky where he was employed as tutor in a private family, studying law between school hours with Hamilton Smith. A year later, he was admitted to the bar at Louisville. He came to Perry County, Indiana during the 1840s.

On March 20, 1852, in Cannelton, Indiana, Mason married Rachel Littell (Huckeby) Wright (1828–1883), the young widow of John G. Wright, the daughter of Joshua B. Huckeby and Rebecca Lang. The couple had no children.

Political career
In 1890, Mason was appointed by president Benjamin Harrison as United States Commissioner for the Indian Territory (before the organization of Oklahoma) with headquarters at Vinita, where he died in June 1894.

Notes

References

Vinita Indian Chieftain, June 14, 1894. Page 2 column 2. Death of Judge Mason.
Goodspeed, Weston A. History of Warrick, Spencer, and Perry Counties, Indiana. Goodspeed Bros. & Co., 1885.
O’Beirne, Harry F., and E. S. O’Beirne. The Indian Territory, Its Chiefs, Legislators and Leading Men (1892).
Hunt, Thomas James de la. Perry County, A History.'' Indianapolis, 1916.

1822 births
1894 deaths
People from Walpole, New Hampshire
Indiana Republicans
Indiana lawyers
People from Perry County, Indiana
Oklahoma Republicans
19th-century American lawyers